Australothis tertia is a species of moth of the family Noctuidae. It is found in Queensland and on Java and Sumatra.

External links
 Australian Faunal Directory

Heliothinae
Moths described in 1941